Robert Stephenson and Hawthorns Ltd (RSH) was a locomotive builder with works in North East England.

History

The company was formed in September 1937 when Robert Stephenson and Company, which was based in Darlington, took over the locomotive building department of Hawthorn Leslie and Company, based in Newcastle upon Tyne.  The goodwill of Leeds locomotive builders Kitson & Co. was obtained in 1938.

RSH locomotive numbering began at 6939, this being the first number following the sum total of locomotives built by Robert Stephenson & Co. and Hawthorn Leslie, (6938).

RSH became part of English Electric in 1955.

Locomotive building at the Newcastle upon Tyne works ended in 1961 and at Darlington in 1964.

Diesel locomotives
RSH entered the diesel locomotive market in November 1937 with a "direct reversing" locomotive fitted with a Crossley two-stroke engine.  There was no reversing gearbox and the diesel engine itself was reversible, as in marine practice.  When starting, in either direction, power was supplied by compressed air until the engine fired. One of these locomotives, Beryl (RSH 7697/1953), is preserved at the Tanfield Railway.
After the 1955 modernisation plan of British Railways RSH responded by building the following class of diesel locomotives some of which are preserved (Including D306 & D318).

Class 04
Class 20
Class 37
Class 40

They also built the following for Australia.

Queensland Railways DL class
WAGR Z class

Preservation

References 

Industrial Railway Society : Various publications.

Stephenson and Hawthorns